Per Lasson (April 18, 1859 — June 6, 1883) was a Norwegian composer.

Biography
He was born in Kristiania (now Oslo), Norway.
He was the son of barrister Christian Lasson (1830–93) and Alexandra Cathrine Henriette von Munthe af Morgenstierne (1838–81). 
His sisters included  painter Oda Krohg (1860–1935) and cabaret singer  Bokken Lasson (1871–1970). His sister Alexandra married painter Frits Thaulow and his sister Soffi married Danish poet Holger Drachmann. 

In 1876 he began law studies in Kristiania. In 1882 he developed a malignant tumor in the palate. He was operated on, both in Norway and in Germany, but died the following year.

His musical compositions were  modest in number  consisting of 15 songs and 9 piano pieces besides an orchestra overture. His most notable composition is the piano solo Crescendo! (1882).

References

External links 
 

1859 births
1883 deaths
19th-century Norwegian composers
19th-century Norwegian male musicians
Norwegian male composers